This article is the list of episodes of the Teleserye, Sana Maulit Muli.

Episode list

Week 1

Week 2

Week 3

Week 4

Week 5

Week 6

Week 7

Week 8

Week 9

Week 10

Week 11

Week 12

See also
 Sana Maulit Muli

References 
 SMM Official Website

Lists of soap opera episodes
Lists of Philippine drama television series episodes